Reginald Poole may refer to:
 Reginald Stuart Poole, English archaeologist, numismatist and Orientalist
 Reginald Lane Poole, British historian
 Sir Reginald Ward Poole, British solicitor